The Voice is an American television music competition to find singing talent amongst all genres of music, regardless of age, and accepts contestants of minor professional background. Its inaugural season was completed in June 2011 and has been broadcast biannually from 2012. The winners and finalists of the seasons have seen varied levels of success with musical releases. Musical releases before their participation on the show are not included in the list.

Singles during The Voice
In a first for a music competition series, NBC and Universal Republic Records (later moved to Republic Records in 2012) offered fans of the show the ability to vote for their favorite artists by purchasing the studio versions of the songs that they perform on the live show each week via the iTunes Store. Only studio versions, not the live version, of its participants' performances are available for download on iTunes. Hot Digital Songs information is included as a rough gauge on the actual sales figures for the songs.

There is generally a studio version released for every song on The Voice by its contestants, except for the Battle Rounds and the Knockout segment of the show. In the first season, the battle rounds were recorded in the studio with both artists in the pairing. However, from season two onwards, only the winner's version of the song from the battle round is released. With the introduction of the Knockout Rounds in season three, where each contestant from the pairing sang a separate song, only the winner's single is released.

Hot 100 singles

The following songs that were sung on The Voice have charted on the Billboard Hot 100 chart.

Bubbling Under Hot 100 singles

The following songs failed to reach the Hot 100, but managed to make the Bubbling Under Hot 100 Singles charts. They are listed separately as the chart has rules that make it easier for new songs to chart, namely that those that have entered the Hot 100 before cannot chart here.

Other notable singles

Hot Digital Songs
The following singles failed to chart on the overall charts, likely because of lack of airplay and online streaming, but still reached high sales figures, comparable to other singles from The Voice that did chart.

By genre

Christian

Country

Latin

R&B / hip hop

Rock

Post-The Voice releases
Only singles that charted on either the Billboard Hot 100 or Bubbling Under Hot 100 charts, and albums that charted on the Billboard 200 chart are included in the following lists.

Singles

Albums

Notes
A Xenia's cover of "Price Tag" entered the Bubbling Under Hot 100 chart at No. 16, but broke into the Billboard Hot 100 at No. 99 in the following week.
B Cassadee Pope's cover of "Over You" re-entered the Hot 100 at No. 84 when it reprised with the finale songs, and received a second iTunes bonus for that period.
C Danielle Bradbery's cover of "Maybe It Was Memphis" re-entered the Hot 100 at No. 93 when it reprised with the finale songs, and received an iTunes bonus for that period. (Original period performed at was not applicable for the iTunes bonus.)
D The Swon Brothers' cover of "Danny's Song" re-entered the Hot 100 at No. 78 when it reprised with the finale songs, and received a second iTunes bonus for that period.
E "Boyfriend" did not enter the Billboard Hot 100, but peaked at No. 18 on the Bubbling Under Hot 100 Singles chart.
F Vicci did not enter the Billboard 200, but peaked at No. 10 on the Heatseekers Albums chart.
G Sing You Home did not enter the Billboard 200, but peaked at No. 5 on the Heatseekers Album chart.
H The Complete Season 5 Collection (The Voice Performance) did not enter the Billboard 200, but peaked at No. 4 on the Heatseekers Album chart.
J "Carousel" did not enter the Hot 100, but peaked on the Bubbling Under Hot 100 chart at No. 19.
K "Pity Party" did not enter the Hot 100, but peaked on the Bubbling Under Hot 100 chart at No. 18.
L "Show & Tell" did not enter the Hot 100, but peaked on the Bubbling Under Hot 100 chart at No. 14.
M "For a Boy" did not enter the Hot 100, but peaked at number 15 on Bubbling Under Hot 100 Singles, which acts as a 25-song extension of the Hot 100.

References
Weekly charts 

Artist chart archives

'Others

Discography
Voice